Kakuan-ji (額安寺) is a Buddhist temple in Yamatokōriyama, Nara Prefecture, Japan. It is affiliated with Shingon Risshu Buddhism, and was founded in 621.

See also 
Historical Sites of Prince Shōtoku

External links 
Official website

Buddhist temples in Nara Prefecture
Shingon Ritsu temples
Prince Shōtoku